And Then You Die is a British comedy panel show broadcast on Dave between 4 December 2007 and 22 January 2008. It was hosted by a puppet called Barrie Stardust who is puppeteered by Dave Chapman. It was one of Dave's first attempts at original programming, the channel having only launched earlier in the same year.

And Then You Die focuses on the theme of life's low points and celebrities. Each episode featured alternating teams of two and had no regular team captains. Guests that have appeared on the show include John Moloney, Jo Caulfield, Robin Ince, Adam Bloom, Stephen K. Amos, Rufus Hound, Mark Dolan, Rob Rouse, Kirsten O'Brien among others.

Reception
According to the Dave website (whose editors quite openly asked for public opinion of the show) and respective message board for the programme itself, public opinion is mixed, with most contributors giving negative feedback on the show.

The show was named "The Worst British TV Panel Show / Satire 2007" in The Comedy.co.uk Awards.

References

External links

2000s British comedy television series
2007 British television series debuts
2008 British television series endings
British comedy television shows
British television shows featuring puppetry
Dave (TV channel) original programming
British panel games
2000s British game shows
Television game shows with incorrect disambiguation